Ekene Igwe-Onu (born December 31, 1988 in Adamawa, Nigeria) is a Nigerian footballer. He currently plays for Enugu Rangers.

References 

1988 births
Living people
Nigerian footballers
Association football forwards
Rangers International F.C. players
Adamawa United F.C. players